The Canton of Saint-Pol-sur-Ternoise is a canton situated in the Pas-de-Calais département and in the Hauts-de-France region of France.

Geography 
This canton is centred on the town of Saint-Pol-sur-Ternoise in the arrondissement of Arras.

Composition 
At the French canton reorganisation which came into effect in March 2015, the canton was expanded from 42 to 87 communes:

Anvin
Aubrometz
Aumerval
Averdoingt
Bailleul-lès-Pernes
Beauvois
Bergueneuse
Bermicourt
Blangerval-Blangermont
Bonnières
Boubers-sur-Canche
Bouret-sur-Canche
Bours
Boyaval
Brias
Buneville
Conchy-sur-Canche
Conteville-en-Ternois
Croisette
Croix-en-Ternois
Écoivres
Eps
Équirre
Érin
Fiefs
Flers
Fleury
Floringhem
Fontaine-lès-Boulans
Fontaine-lès-Hermans
Fortel-en-Artois
Foufflin-Ricametz
Framecourt
Frévent
Gauchin-Verloingt
Gouy-en-Ternois
Guinecourt
Hautecloque
Héricourt
Herlincourt
Herlin-le-Sec
Hernicourt
Hestrus
Heuchin
Huclier
Humerœuille
Humières
Ligny-sur-Canche
Ligny-Saint-Flochel
Linzeux
Lisbourg
Maisnil
Marest
Marquay
Moncheaux-lès-Frévent
Monchel-sur-Canche
Monchy-Breton
Monchy-Cayeux
Monts-en-Ternois
Nédon
Nédonchel
Neuville-au-Cornet
Nuncq-Hautecôte
Œuf-en-Ternois
Ostreville
Pernes
Pierremont
Prédefin
Pressy
Ramecourt
Roëllecourt
Sachin
Sains-lès-Pernes
Saint-Michel-sur-Ternoise
Saint-Pol-sur-Ternoise 
Séricourt
Sibiville
Siracourt
Tangry
Teneur
Ternas
La Thieuloye
Tilly-Capelle
Troisvaux
Vacquerie-le-Boucq
Valhuon
Wavrans-sur-Ternoise

Population

See also
 Arrondissement of Arras
 Cantons of Pas-de-Calais
 Communes of Pas-de-Calais

References

Saint-Pol-sur-Ternoise